That I May Live is a 1937 American crime film directed by Allan Dwan, written by Ben Markson and William M. Conselman, and starring Rochelle Hudson, Robert Kent, J. Edward Bromberg, Jack La Rue, Frank Conroy and Fred Kelsey. It was released on April 30, 1937, by 20th Century Fox.

Plot

Cast   
Rochelle Hudson as Irene Howard
Robert Kent as Dick Mannion
J. Edward Bromberg as Tex Shapiro
Jack La Rue as Charlie
Frank Conroy as Pop
Fred Kelsey as Abner Jenkins
George Cooper as Mack
DeWitt Jennings as Chief of Police
Russell Simpson as Bish Plivens
William "Billy" Benedict as Kurt Plivens

References

External links 
 

1937 films
20th Century Fox films
American crime films
1937 crime films
Films directed by Allan Dwan
American black-and-white films
1930s English-language films
1930s American films